John J. Brown, S.J., was an American Roman Catholic priest and educator.

A Roman Catholic priest of the Society of Jesus, Brown was rector of Sacred Heart College (now Regis University) in Denver, Colorado. He was appointed bishop of the Roman Catholic Diocese of El Paso, Texas, on January 22, 1915. However, Brown resigned in June 1915 before his ordination as bishop, because of ill health.

Notes

American Roman Catholic priests
19th-century American Jesuits
20th-century American Jesuits
Presidents of Regis University
Roman Catholic Diocese of El Paso
Year of birth missing
Year of death missing